Tylodina is a genus of  medium-sized sea snails or false limpets  in the family Tylodinidae.

Species

Species within the genus Tylodina include:
 Tylodina americana
 Tylodina corticalis
 Tylodina fungina- Observed solitary, in pairs and aggregating in small groups in reefs around San Clemente Island, the southernmost Channel Islands off the coast of Southern California July 2015.
 Tylodina perversa

References

External links 

Tylodinidae
Taxa named by Constantine Samuel Rafinesque